Kevin Sousa may refer to:

 Kevin Sousa (chef), American chef
 Kevin Sousa (footballer), Cabo Verdean footballer